The Cleveland City Stars were an American professional soccer team based in Cleveland, Ohio, United States. Founded in 2006, the team played in the USL First Division (USL-1), the second tier of the American Soccer Pyramid in 2009. The club folded soon after the 2009 season.

The team played its home games at Bearcat Stadium (renamed Middlefield Cheese Stadium for sponsorship purposes) on the campus of Bedford High School in nearby Bedford, Ohio, where they played in 2009. The team's colors were green, black and white. Their final head coach was Rod Underwood.

History 
The Cleveland City Stars were founded in 2006 as a member of the USL Second Division and played their inaugural season in 2007. The team found success early on, going undefeated for the first nine games before losing to the Charlotte Eagles in the tenth game of the season.  They ended the regular season undefeated at home, and clinched the second seed for the USL-2 play-offs, where they progressed to the semi-final, and lost to eventual champions Harrisburg 1–0 after extra time.

The team's success continued in 2008 as they finished the regular season unbeaten at home.  City posted a 10–3–7 record, which proved good enough for third place in the USL Second Division, and playoff qualification.  They faced the Western Mass Pioneers in the quarterfinals and won 4–2.  They traveled to Richmond for the semi-final and won 1–0 after extra time.  The City Stars hosted the championship game and defeated Charlotte 2–1 for the team's first championship.

During 2007 & 2008 season the Cleveland City Stars operated a reserve team that competed against PDL, international & other U23 teams. The program was lead and coached by Kent Manson, James Jaggard and Marcelo Galvao.

On December 4, 2008 the first team announced that they would compete in the USL First Division for the 2009 season.

Soon after the end of the 2009 USL First Division season, the City Stars club folded due to financial issues.

Players

Final roster

Year-by-year

Honors 
USL Second Division
Winners (1): 2008

Head coaches 
  Martin Rennie (2007–2008)
  Rod Underwood (2009)
  James Jaggard (U23 Head Coach) (2007-2008)

Stadia 
 Krenzler Field; Cleveland, Ohio (2007–2008)
 Middlefield Cheese Stadium at Bedford High School; Bedford, Ohio (2009)

Television 
On April 7, 2008, the City Stars announced a deal with SportsTime Ohio that saw all of the team's home games aired on the station.  Each match aired tape delayed on game night with replays airing on Sundays.  Play-by-play and color commentary was provided by Desmond Armstrong, 1994 World Cup TV commentator and former US national team player, and Glen Duerr, a former City Stars player.  The broadcast included a half-time segment highlighting the team's weekly inner-city coaching and life-lessons program.

On April 6, 2009, the City Stars announced a new deal with SportsTime Ohio to air 12 home games.  Glen Duerr returned and was joined by two new TV commentators, Mark Zimmerman and Steve Bell, former A-League (USL-1) and MLS player.  Bell also did play-by-play for three matches on Fox Soccer Channel.

See also 
 USL First Division teams

References

External links 
 Official Site of the Cleveland City Stars
 Official site of the United Soccer Leagues
 Official Green Army Forum

 
Association football clubs established in 2006
Association football clubs disestablished in 2009
S
USL First Division teams
Former USL Second Division teams
Soccer clubs in Ohio
2006 establishments in Ohio
2009 disestablishments in Ohio
Bedford, Ohio